These genera belong to Opatrini, a tribe of darkling beetles in the family Tenebrionidae.

Opatrini genera

 Aconobius Casey, 1895  (North America)
 Adavius Mulsant & Rey, 1859  (the Palearctic and Indomalaya)
 Adoryacus Koch, 1963  (tropical Africa)
 Amathobius Gebien, 1920  (tropical Africa)
 Amblysphagus Fairmaire, 1896  (tropical Africa and Indomalaya)
 Ammidium Erichson, 1843  (tropical Africa)
 Ammobius Guérin-Méneville, 1844  (the Palearctic and Indomalaya)
 Ammodonus Mulsant & Rey, 1859  (North America and the Neotropics)
 Amphithrixoides Bouchard & Löbl, 2008  (the Palearctic)
 Anatrum Reichardt, 1936  (the Palearctic)
 Arabammobius Grimm & Lillig, 2020  (the Palearctic and tropical Africa)
 Asiocaedius G.S. Medvedev & Nepesova, 1985  (the Palearctic)
 Austrocaribius Marcuzzi, 1954  (the Neotropics)
 Blacodatus Koch, 1963  (tropical Africa)
 Blapstinus Dejean, 1821  (North America, the Neotropics, and Oceania)
 Blenosia Laporte, 1840  (tropical Africa)
 Brachyesthes Fairmaire, 1868  (the Palearctic and Indomalaya)
 Brachyidium Fairmaire, 1883  (Indomalaya, Australasia, and Oceania)
 Caediexis Lebedev, 1932  (the Palearctic)
 Caediomorpha Blackburn, 1888  (Australasia)
 Caedius Blanchard, 1845  (the Palearctic, tropical Africa, Indomalaya, and Australasia)
 Calaharena Koch, 1963  (tropical Africa)
 Cenophorus Mulsant & Rey, 1859  (the Neotropics)
 Clitobius Mulsant & Rey, 1859  (the Palearctic and tropical Africa)
 Coeloecetes Blair, 1929  (Indomalaya)
 Conibiosoma Casey, 1890  (North America)
 Conibius LeConte, 1851  (North America, the Neotropics, and Oceania)
 Corinta Koch, 1950  (tropical Africa)
 Cornopterus Koch, 1950  (tropical Africa)
 Crististibes Koch, 1963  (tropical Africa)
 Cybotus Casey, 1890  (the Neotropics)
 Cyptus Gerstaecker, 1871  (the Palearctic and tropical Africa)
 Diaderma Koch, 1960  (tropical Africa)
 Diastolinus Mulsant & Rey, 1859  (the Neotropics)
 Dilamus Jacquelin du Val, 1861  (the Palearctic and tropical Africa)
 Diphyrrhynchus Fairmaire, 1849  (the Palearctic, tropical Africa, Indomalaya, Australasia, and Oceania)
 Eichleria Kaminski, 2015  (tropical Africa)
 Emmalus Erichson, 1843  (tropical Africa)
 Ephalus LeConte, 1862  (North America and the Neotropics)
 Eremostibes Koch, 1963  (tropical Africa)
 Eumylada Reitter, 1904  (the Palearctic)
 Eurycaulus Fairmaire, 1868  (the Palearctic and tropical Africa)
 Falsammidium Koch, 1960  (tropical Africa)
 Falsocaedius Español, 1943  (the Palearctic)
 Falsolobodera Kaszab, 1967  (the Palearctic)
 Freyula Koch, 1959  (tropical Africa)
 Goajiria Ivie & Hart, 2016  (the Neotropics)
 Gonocephalum Solier, 1834  (North America, tropical Africa, Indomalaya, Australasia, and Oceania)
 Hadrodes Wollaston, 1877  (the Palearctic)
 Hadrophasis Ferrer, 1992  (tropical Africa)
 Helenomelas Ardoin, 1972  (the Palearctic)
 Helibatus Mulsant & Rey, 1859  (tropical Africa)
 Heterocheira Dejean, 1836  (tropical Africa and Australasia)
 Heterotarsus Latreille, 1829  (the Palearctic, tropical Africa, and Indomalaya)
 Hovarygmus Fairmaire, 1898  (tropical Africa)
 Hummelinckia Marcuzzi, 1954  (the Neotropics)
 Jintaium Ren, 1999  (the Palearctic)
 Luebbertia Koch, 1963  (tropical Africa)
 Mateuina Español, 1944  (the Palearctic)
 Melanesthes Dejean, 1834  (the Palearctic)
 Melanocoma Wollaston, 1868  (tropical Africa)
 Mesomorphus Miedel, 1880  (the Palearctic, tropical Africa, Indomalaya, Australasia, and Oceania)
 Messoricolum Koch, 1960  (tropical Africa)
 Microstizopus Koch, 1963  (tropical Africa)
 Moragacinella Español, 1954  (the Palearctic)
 Myladina Reitter, 1889  (the Palearctic)
 Namazopus Koch, 1963  (tropical Africa)
 Nemanes Fairmaire, 1888  (tropical Africa)
 Neopachypterus Bouchard, Löbl & Merkl, 2007  (the Palearctic and Indomalaya)
 Nesocaedius Kolbe, 1915  (the Palearctic and Indomalaya)
 Nevisia Marcuzzi, 1986  (the Neotropics)
 Nocibiotes Casey, 1895  (North America)
 Notibius LeConte, 1851  (North America)
 Opatroides Brullé, 1832  (North America, tropical Africa, Indomalaya, and Australasia)
 Opatrum Fabricius, 1775  (the Palearctic)
 Pachymastus Fairmaire, 1896  (tropical Africa)
 Parastizopus Gebien, 1938  (tropical Africa)
 Penthicinus Reitter, 1896  (the Palearctic)
 Penthicus Faldermann, 1836  (the Palearctic and tropical Africa)
 Periloma Gebien, 1938  (tropical Africa)
 Perithrix Fairmaire, 1879  (the Palearctic)
 Phelopatrum Marseul, 1876  (the Palearctic)
 Planostibes Gemminger, 1870  (tropical Africa)
 Platylus Mulsant & Rey, 1859  (the Neotropics)
 Platynosum Mulsant & Rey, 1859  (the Palearctic)
 Platyprocnemis Español & Lindberg, 1963  (tropical Africa)
 Plesioderes Mulsant & Rey, 1859  (tropical Africa and Indomalaya)
 Pocadiopsis Fairmaire, 1896  (Indomalaya)
 Polycoelogastridion Reichardt, 1936  (the Palearctic and Indomalaya)
 Prodilamus Ardoin, 1969  (the Palearctic and tropical Africa)
 Proscheimus Desbrochers des Loges, 1881  (the Palearctic)
 Psammestus Reichardt, 1936  (the Palearctic)
 Psammogaster Koch, 1953  (tropical Africa)
 Pseudolamus Fairmaire, 1874  (the Palearctic)
 Pseudoleichenum Ardoin, 1972  (tropical Africa)
 Raynalius Chatanay, 1912  (tropical Africa)
 Reichardtiellina Kaszab, 1982  (the Palearctic)
 Scleroides Fairmaire, 1883  (Australasia)
 Scleropatroides Löbl & Merkl, 2003  (the Palearctic, tropical Africa, and Indomalaya)
 Scleropatrum Reitter, 1887  (the Palearctic and Indomalaya)
 Sclerum Dejean, 1834  (the Palearctic, tropical Africa, and Indomalaya)
 Scymena Pascoe, 1866  (Australasia)
 Sinorus Mulsant & Revelière, 1861  (the Palearctic)
 Sobas Pascoe, 1863  (Australasia)
 Socotropatrum Koch, 1970  (tropical Africa)
 Sphaerostibes Koch, 1963  (tropical Africa)
 Stizopus Erichson, 1843  (tropical Africa)
 Sulpius Fairmaire, 1906  (tropical Africa)
 Syntyphlus Koch, 1953  (tropical Africa)
 Tarphiophasis Wollaston, 1877  (tropical Africa)
 Tidiguinia Español, 1959  (the Palearctic)
 Tonibiastes Casey, 1895  (North America)
 Tonibius Casey, 1895  (North America)
 Trichosternum Wollaston, 1861  (tropical Africa)
 Trichoton Hope, 1841  (North America and the Neotropics)
 Trigonopilus Fairmaire, 1893  (Indomalaya)
 Trigonopoda Gebien, 1914  (Indomalaya)
 Ulus Horn, 1870  (North America and the Neotropics)
 Weisea Semenov, 1891  (the Palearctic)
 Wolladrus Iwan & Kaminski, 2016  (the Palearctic)
 Xerolinus Ivie & Hart, 2016  (the Neotropics)
 † Eupachypterus Kirejtshuk, Nabozhenko & Nel, 2010
 † Palaeosclerum Nabozhenko & Kirejtshuk, 2017

References